Minasniyuq (Spanish minas mines, Quechua -ni, -yuq  suffixes, "the one with mines", Hispanicized spelling Minasniyoc) is a mountain in the Wansu mountain range in the Andes of Peru, about  high. It is situated in the Arequipa Region, La Unión Province, Puyca District, and in the Cusco Region, Chumbivilcas Province, Santo Tomás District. It lies northwest of the mountain Qullpa K'uchu.

It is an important tributary of the Apurímac River, the source of the Amazon River.

See also 
 Kunturillu

References 

Mountains of Peru
Mountains of Arequipa Region
Mountains of Cusco Region